Dusan Grozaj (12 July 1955 – 1984) was a German swimmer. He competed in the men's 1500 metre freestyle at the 1972 Summer Olympics.

References

External links
 

1955 births
1984 deaths
German male swimmers
Olympic swimmers of West Germany
Swimmers at the 1972 Summer Olympics
Sportspeople from Bratislava
German male freestyle swimmers